Girighiz is an Italian comic strip created by Enzo Lunari.

Background 
Girighiz first appeared in August 1965, in the comic magazine Linus.

Set in the prehistoric age, the cartoon strip, unlike Johnny Hart's similar BC, is openly political and satirical.

References

External links 

Italian comics titles
Italian comic strips
Comics characters introduced in 1965
1965 comics debuts
Comic strips ended in the 1990s
Humor comics
Satirical comics
Comics about politics
Gag-a-day comics
Fictional prehistoric characters
Comics set in prehistory
Italian comics characters